This is a list of the main thermal power plants in Romania which at the end of 2006 had a total generating capacity of 11.335 MW.

Coal/Oil/Gas

Hydroelectric

Nuclear

Wind farms

Solar farms

See also 

Energy in Romania
List of coal power stations
List of largest power stations in the world

References

 
 
Romania, thermal
Power stations